The Mercedes-Benz W196 was a Formula One racing car produced by Mercedes-Benz for the  and  F1 seasons.  Successor to the W194, in the hands of Juan Manuel Fangio and Stirling Moss it won 9 of 12 races entered and captured the only two world championships in which it competed.

Firsts included the use of desmodromic valves and Daimler-Benz developed mechanical direct fuel injection adapted from the DB 601 high-performance V12 used on the Messerschmitt Bf 109E fighter during World War II.

The legendary 3-liter 300 SLR (Sport Leicht-Rennen, eng: Sport Light-Racing) was derived from the W196 for the 1955 World Sportscar Championship season.  Its crash at Le Mans that year ended not only its own short-lived domination on the WSC circuit but spelled the end also for the W196, as Mercedes pulled out of competitive racing in 1955 and did not return for another three decades.

Types

Monza

The W196's delayed debut at the 1954 French Grand Prix saw the introduction of the aerodynamic closed-wheel aluminium "Type Monza" streamliner body for the high speed track at Reims. Juan Manuel Fangio and Karl Kling claimed a 1–2 finish, and Hans Herrmann posted the fastest lap. The same body was later used only three more times: at the 1954 British Grand Prix at Silverstone, 1954 Italian Grand Prix at Monza, where it picked up its nickname in 1954, and at Monza again at the 1955 Italian Grand Prix. In total the "Type Monza" won three races (1954 French Grand Prix, 1954 and 1955 Italian Grand Prix), all with Fangio at the wheel. These three Grands Prix have remained the only races won by a closed-wheel car in Formula One history.

Open wheel
Attractive as the Monza was, its streamlined body was really only suited to high-speed tracks made up of straights and slow corners, leading to defeat at its second race, the British Grand Prix at the high-speed corner dominated Silverstone circuit, where Fangio hit a number of oil barrels that marked out the circuit. A conventional open-wheel-version was introduced for the most important race on the calendar for Mercedes, the German Grand Prix at the twisty and long Nürburgring. Fangio, who had already won the first two GPs of 1954 with a Maserati in his home city of Buenos Aires and at Spa, won this and the two following GPs in Switzerland with the 'open wheel' version and Italy, as said, on the closed-wheel streamlined 'Type Monza', securing his 2nd World Championship.

At the Spanish Grand Prix in Barcelona, the last race of the 1954 season the low-mounted Mercedes air-intake clogged with leaves, costing the race to Mike Hawthorn in a Ferrari, and leading to the intake's relocation atop the hood.

In the shortened 1955 Formula One season, abbreviated after the Le Mans disaster, the W196 won every race except the Monaco Grand Prix, where Hans Herrmann crashed in practice and the other three team Mercedes cars failed to finish. A highlight for driver Stirling Moss was his finish 0.2 seconds ahead of stable mate Fangio at his home event, the British Grand Prix, his first GP win, a race where Mercedes romped home with a 1–2–3–4 finish.

After capturing the two world championships it competed in, Mercedes withdrew from motorsport at the end of the 1955 season. Despite its strong reliability and good track performance, drivers Fangio and Moss described the car in MotorSport magazine as being "a bit difficult to drive, with a tendency for snap oversteer". Moss also later said that "I'm surprised that the Merc wasn't a little bit easier to drive, because it wasn't. It was a driver's car, but not an easy car to drive." Fangio shared similar feelings, also saying in MotorSport Magazine in 1979 that the car was "not so nice to drive as a Maserati 250F, but you were almost sure to finish. So the Mercedes was incredible in that way." 1970s/80s Formula One driver John Watson drove the W196 at Hockenheim, providing some insight as to why the car was difficult to drive. He said that "if you gave this car wider and grippier tyres and altered the suspension to suit, then the handling would be of a very high order indeed." The W196 was so advanced and ahead of its time, that the narrow tyres available at the time simply could not fully handle the car's exceptional performance and potential.

Engine 

The new 1954 Formula One rules allowed a choice of naturally aspirated engines – up to 2.5 litres or 0.75 litres supercharged.

Mercedes' 1939 2-stage supercharged 1.5-litre 64.0×58.0 mm V8 gave  at 8,250 rpm with about  pressure. Halving this would have only produced .

Fuel consumption of this  net engine would have been 2.3 times higher than a naturally aspirated one developing the same power. Since 115 bhp/L (86 kW/L) at 9,000 rpm was being developed by naturally aspirated motorcycle racing engines, it was decided that a 2.5-litre engine was the correct choice. This was a significant change of philosophy, since all previous Mercedes-Benz Grand Prix engines since the 1920s had been supercharged. Mercedes' solution was to adapt direct fuel injection Daimler-Benz engineers had refined on the DB 601 high-performance V12 used on the Messerschmitt Bf 109E fighter.

By its introduction at the 1954 French GP the  (76.0×68.8 mm)  desmodromic valves straight 8 delivered . The W196 was the only F1 car with such advanced fuel technology, giving it a considerable advantage over the other carburetted engines. Variable length inlet tracts were experimented with and four wheel drive considered. An eventual  at 10,000 rpm was targeted for the 2.5-litre F1 motor.

Chassis and suspension 

The W196 was front mid-engined, with its long longitudinally mounted engine placed just behind the front axles instead of over them to better balance front/rear weight distribution. A welded aluminum tube spaceframe chassis carried ultra-light Elektron magnesium-alloy bodywork (having a specific gravity of 1.8, less than a quarter of iron's 7.8), which contributed substantially to keeping dry weight down.

To enhance stopping power extra wide diameter drum brakes too large to fit inside 16" wheel rims were used, mounted inboard with short half shafts and two universal joints per wheel.  Torsion bars fitted inside the frame's tubes were used in the double wishbone front. To prevent cornering forces from raising the car, as occurs with short swing axles, the rear used a low-roll center system featuring off-centered beams spanning from each hub to the opposite side of the chassis crossing one-another over the centerline. Nevertheless, snap-oversteer could still be a notable problem at speed.

W196S

The Mercedes-Benz 300 SLR (W196S) was a 2-seat, 3-litre sports racer derived in 1955 from the W196, sharing most of its drivetrain, chassis, and engine.  To compete in the World Sportscar Championship, the W196's fuel-injected 2,496.87 cc straight 8 was bored and stroked to 2,981.70 cc, boosting output to 310 bhp (230 kW).

The W196's monoposto driving position was modified to standard two-abreast seating, headlights were added, and a few other changes made to adapt a strictly track competitor to a 24-hour road/track sports racer.  The 300 SLR/W196S took sportscar racing by storm in 1955, winning that year's championship before a catastrophic crash and fire at Le Mans ended its domination prematurely.

W196 sale

The auction house Bonhams – in its Goodwood Festival of Speed Sale on 12 July 2013 – sold Mercedes-Benz W196R chassis serial '00006/54' for a new World Record £19.7-million Sterling  ($29.6 million, incl. auction premium). The total bill, including UK VAT on commission charged, came to £20,896,800.00 Sterling.  This high price was achieved in recognition of the fact that chassis '00006/54' is the only example of the model available in private hands – all its surviving sisters being in original manufacturer or institutional Museum hands. This particular car is also the most successful of all surviving W196R cars – being the individual driven by Juan Manuel Fangio to win the 1954 German & European Grand Prix at the Nurburgring, and then adding a second consecutive victory in the 1954 Swiss GP at Berne's Bremgarten circuit. With that second race win, added to his early-season victories in the Argentine and Belgian GPs in a Maserati 250F, Fangio clinched the second of his ultimately five Formula 1 Drivers' World Championship titles.

Complete Formula One World Championship results 
(key)

 Indicates shared drive.   Indicates streamlined version used.

See also
 Mercedes-Benz W194
 Mercedes-Benz 300 SLR (W196S)
 Mercedes-Benz in Formula One

References

Notes

Bibliography

External links
F1 results
W196 Images
World record auction result for a car
Martin Brundle & Lewis Hamilton driving the W196 Monza bodied car

W196
Formula One championship-winning cars